Hinduism in Réunion constitutes a significant part of the island's population. The island of Réunion is home to approximately 200,000 Indian descendants amongst the roughly 800,000 strong population. Estimates of practicing Hindus vary from 6.7% to 10.7%. Yet, uncertainty as to the exact number of Hindus in the country results from the fact that ethnic and religious questions are forbidden in French censuses and members of the Indian population sometimes cross-identify with Roman Catholic and Hindu faiths.

The most recent arrivals of Tamil Hindus are from Sri Lanka and most came as refugees.

History
The history of Hinduism in Réunion stretches back to the mid and late nineteenth century. Many early Indian arrivals took on Christian names and had their children baptised in the Catholic Church at the insistence of their employers or the government administration. Even so, they did not abandon Hinduism in the process. Christian missionaries argued that the custom of lighting camphor before the Hindu God was an illustration of black magic, whereas lighting candle in the Church was a sure way to salvation.

With the exception of the Muslims who came to the island from Gujarat, all Indians were routinely reassigned as Catholics, more or less by force. Most of the conversions to Christianity took place during the period of indenture.

Hinduism today

Although many have converted to Christianity, in the rear portion of every Tamil Christian house, there is usually a small structure dedicated to the Hindu goddess Mariamman where they worship. Several Hindu traditions have been subsumed by Christian traditions. The cult of Mariamman has been absorbed into the worship of Virgin Mary. Janmashtami, birth day of God Krishna, is considered to be the date of birth of Jesus Christ. Saint Expedit, worshipped locally, is identified with Goddess Kali.

In recent years, there has been a revival of Hinduism among members of the Tamil community. This has led to the establishment of many temples and ashrams. Some Gurukkals (Temple priests) were also brought from Tamil Nadu as a part of this. Nonetheless, Dr Kalai Selvam Shanmugam, President of the Tamil Sangham in Reunion speaking at the Chennai Centre for Global Studies in 2018 regretted that some Temple priests brought from Tamil Nadu had been more interested in making money than in spreading the gospels of Hinduism. An interesting feature, likely peculiar to Réunion, is the simultaneous observance by some ethnic Indians of both Catholic and Hindu rites, a practice that has earned them the sobriquet of being "socially Catholic and privately Hindu."

The French government gathers no statistics on religious affiliation. Because of this, it is impossible to know accurately how many Hindus there are in Réunion. Most of the large towns have a functioning Hindu temple.

References and notes

See also
Hinduism by country
Hinduism in South Africa
Hinduism in France

External links
Indentured immigration and social accommodation in La Réunion by Christian Ghasarian, University of California-Berkeley

Religion in Réunion
Réunion